Intercomprehension is when people try to communicate with each other using their own different languages. Intercomprehension can be explained as a dialogue between people from two different languages. Each one expresses in their own language, making efforts to understand each other.

Here we find some European methods to learn Intercomprehension. These four methods were the pioneer in this branch of linguistics and started around 2000 in different universities: Galatea, EuRom4, EuroComRom (Les sept tamis), et Understanding romance languages. All these methods focused in reading skills learning simultaneously in different Latin languages as these languages are so close in semantics, phonetics, etymology etc.

See also 
 mutual intelligibility

References

External links
 Galanet: Intercomprehension in Latin languages
 Lingalog: practical and common distance work using Intercomprehension
 Galapro : Teaching Teachers to Latin Languages Intercomprehension
 EuroComCenter: The service centre to the European multilingualism
 Itinéraires Romans: Intercomprehension in Latin languages from The Latin Union
 Euro-mania: European project Socrates Lingua 2
 Redinter: European Intercomprehension Network
 Receptive Learning of European languages through Intercomprehension
 links about Intercomprehension

Interlinguistics
Human communication
Cross-cultural studies
Sociolinguistics